Above All Else in the World is a 1941 German drama film directed by Karl Ritter and starring Paul Hartmann, Hannes Stelzer and Fritz Kampers. The title refers to the second line of the German national anthem. It was made as a propaganda film designed to promote Nazi Germany's war aims in the Second World War.

Synopsis
Following the outbreak of war, Germans abroad face persecution from the British and French authorities.

Cast

 Paul Hartmann as Otl. Steinhart
 Hannes Stelzer as Hans Wiegand
 Fritz Kampers as Fritz Möbius
 Carl Raddatz as Carl Wiegand
 Oskar Sima as Leo Samek
 Maria Bard as Madeleine LaRoche
 Berta Drews as Anna Möbius
 Carsta Löck as Erika Möbius
 Marina von Ditmar as Brigitte
 Joachim Brennecke as Willy Möbius
 Karl John as Olt. Hassencamp
 Josef Dahmen as Uffz. Weber
 Georg Thomalla as Uffz. Krause
 Herbert A.E. Böhme as Kapitän Hansen
 Wilhelm König as Funker Boysen
 Karl Haubenreißer as Sally Nürnberg
 Andrews Engelmann as Capt. John Stanley
 Hans Baumann as Robert Brown
 Ernst Sattler as Rainthaler
 Lutz Götz as Hofer
 Albert Janscheck as Reindl
 Marianne Straub as Walburga
 Peter Elsholtz as Dr. v. Krisis
 Kunibert Gensichen as Reg.-Ass. Glockenburg
 Eva Tinschmann as Oberschwester Isolde
 Oscar Sabo as Friedrich Wilhelm Hoppe
 Gerhard Dammann as Siemens-Werkmeister
 Beppo Brem as Putzenlechner
 Hermann Gunther as Elsässischer Bürgermeister
 Günther Polensen as Flieger-Leutnant Nacke
 Willi Rose
 Fanny Cotta
 Heinz Welzel
 Franz Lichtenauer
 Paul Schwed
 Herbert Scholz
 Wolfgang Molitor

References

Bibliography

External links 
 

1941 films
1940s war drama films
German war drama films
Films of Nazi Germany
1940s German-language films
Films directed by Karl Ritter
Nazi World War II propaganda films
UFA GmbH films
German black-and-white films
1941 drama films
1940s German films